Benjamin Camden John Funnell (born 6 June 1990) is a New Zealand rugby union player who currently plays as a hooker for  in New Zealand's domestic Mitre 10 Cup and the  in the international Super Rugby competition.

Early career

Born in Palmerston North in New Zealand's Manawatū-Whanganui region, Funnell grew up on a dairy farm in the small town of Opiki, 15 km to the south-west of his birthplace.   He is a cousin of the Whitelock brothers; George, Adam, Sam and Luke who all went on to play for Canterbury and the Crusaders and attended the same primary school as the boys before attending Palmerston North Boys' High School, where he captained their rugby first XV, while the Whitelocks attended the rival Feilding High School.

While in school, Funnell represented  at under-18 level before heading south to Christchurch after graduation to study accounting at university.   He joined the High School Old Boys side which compete in the local Canterbury club rugby competition and also made his way through the Canterbury youth structures, turning out for both their Academy and Colts sides as well as the Crusaders Knights development team.

Senior career

Funnell first made the Canterbury squad for the 2011 ITM Cup and immediately made a big impression.   Taking advantage of an injury to Steve Fualau, he made his national provincial championship debut as a replacement for Paul Ngauamo in the first match of the season against  and went on to play 7 times during his first year at provincial level, lifting the Premiership trophy for the first time as Canterbury overcame  12–3 in the final.

He was again an ITM Cup winner in 2012 and also established himself as the province's first choice in the number 2 jersey, playing 9 times as Canterbury this time downed  in the final.

2014 was more of a struggle both for Canterbury, who were knocked out of the ITM Cup by local rivals  at the semi-final stage and for Funnell who despite playing 10 times faced stiff competition for a starting spot from future All Black Codie Taylor.   However, 2015 ITM Cup saw Funnell re-establish himself as first-choice hooker, playing all 12 games, including 10 starts as Canterbury reclaimed their Premiership title by defeating  25–23 in the final while Taylor's elevation to the All Blacks squad in 2016 left Funnell as the undisputed holder of the number 2 shirt and he once again played every game during the season as the men from Christchurch were crowned champions of New Zealand for the 8th time in 9 years.

Super Rugby

An impressive debut season for Canterbury in 2011 saw Funnell elevated to the Crusaders squad for the 2012 Super Rugby season.

Flynn's departure for Toulouse at the end of 2014 left Funnell as first choice hooker for the 2015 season with Codie Taylor and Ged Robinson serving as his back ups. Funnell played in all 16 games of a disappointing season for the Crusaders, starting 10 games to Taylor's 6 as the men from Christchurch finished in 7th place on the final log, just outside of the play-off spots.

The season was a struggle for Funnell as he lost his starting spot to Taylor and had to make do with just 1 start in 9 appearances.

International

Funnell was a New Zealand Schools representative in 2008.

Career honours

Canterbury

National Provincial Championship – 2011, 2012, 2013, 2015, 2016

Super Rugby statistics

References 

1990 births
New Zealand rugby union players
Crusaders (rugby union) players
Canterbury rugby union players
Rugby union hookers
Rugby union players from Palmerston North
People educated at Palmerston North Boys' High School
Living people
Dalzell-Whitelock family
Black Rams Tokyo players